"Gotta Find Me a Lover (24 Hours a Day)" is a song that became a hit on Billboard's R&B chart in 1969, reaching #40, for Erma Franklin. It was written by Carl Davis and Eugene Record. The song was Franklin's last R&B hit. It was Brunswick # 55403.

Charts

References

1969 songs
1969 singles
Erma Franklin songs
Songs written by Eugene Record
Brunswick Records singles